The Copa Ganadores de Copa, also known as Recopa Sudamericana de Clubes, was a South American football tournament organized by CONMEBOL. Its first edition was held in 1970 and was won by Bolivian club Mariscal Santa Cruz. The second edition was organized in 1971, however, Group One matches have never been played and the tournament reduced to a friendly competition at the end and the winner of Group Two was crowned the champion. The competition was not held after this year.

The tournament was contested by football clubs which were the most recent winners of South American domestic cup competitions or the highest team club that did not qualify for the Copa Libertadores. The actual qualifying criteria varied across countries.

It should not be confused with Recopa Sudamericana, the competition played between the champion of Copa Libertadores and Copa Sudamericana.

Format
The competition was a round robin tournament with two groups, each group was played in a different city. The group winners qualify for the two-legged final.

Different countries used different methods of qualification.

 Argentina: Winner of Copa Argentina (in 1970, as the winner Boca Juniors earned eligibility of Copa Libertadores, the runner-up Atlanta entered this tournament)
 Bolivia: Winner of Play-off between the two teams tied on points in 3rd place of the Copa Simón Bolívar 1969
 Chile: Winner of Play-off between the two teams tied on points in 3rd place of the 1969 Chilean League.
 Ecuador: Winner of Copa Ecuador
 Paraguay: The highest-placed team in the league not to qualify for the Copa Libertadores
 Peru: The highest-placed team in the league not to qualify for the Copa Libertadores
 Uruguay: Winner of the Torneo de Copa
 Venezuela: Winner of the Copa de Venezuela (in 1970, as the winner Deportivo Galicia earned eligibility of Copa Libertadores, the runner-up Unión Deportiva Canarias entered this tournament)

1970

1971

Teams

Group 2

Results 
Brazil and Colombia decided not to enter the competition again. The same format was adopted as the previous session.

Nonetheless, on February 25, 1971, CONMEBOL decided to reduce it into a friendly tournament and there would not be a trophy, because Deportes Concepción withdrew from the tournament and confirmation of participation had not been received from Huracán Buceo. Matches in Group One were never played and América, the winner of Group Two, was regarded as the champion of the friendly tournament. 
But although CONMEBOL does not list the 1971 edition as an official tournament, the IFFHS (International Federation of Football History and Statistics) count it as an official competition to his numbers and records.

Group Two matches were played in parallel with Group Five matches of the 1971 Copa Libertadores.

References

Defunct CONMEBOL club competitions
Recurring sporting events established in 1970
Recurring events disestablished in 1971